Colombia Migration is Colombia's border control agency responsible for monitoring and conducting migratory control within the framework of national sovereignty and in accordance with the law.

History
After the dissolution of the Administrative Department of Security, which was also in charge of migratory services, the Colombian Government, under the Ministry of Foreign Affairs, created Migración Colombia in order to carry out border control and migration  enforcement tasks. Customs formalities are carried out by the National Directorate of Taxes and Customs, a separate agency under the Ministry of Finance and Public Credit.

Border posts

Airports
 El Edén International Airport in Armenia
 Ernesto Cortissoz International Airport in Barranquilla
 El Dorado International Airport in Bogotá
 Palonegro International Airport in Bucaramanga
 Alfonso Bonilla Aragón International Airport in Cali
 Rafael Núñez International Airport in Cartagena de Indias
 Camilo Daza International Airport in Cúcuta
 Alfredo Vásquez Cobo International Airport in Leticia
 José María Córdova International Airport in Medellín
 Matecaña International Airport in Pereira
 Almirante Padilla Airport in Riohacha
 Gustavo Rojas Pinilla International Airport in San Andrés
 Simón Bolívar International Airport in Santa Marta
 Alfonso López Pumarejo Airport in Valledupar
 Apiay Air Force Base in Villavicencio

Fluvial
 Leticia in Amazonas
 Inírida in Guainía
 Puerto Leguízamo in Putumayo
 Puerto Carreño in Vichada

Maritime
 Turbo in Antioquia
 Barranquilla in Atlantico
 Cartagena in Bolívar
 Bahía Solano in Chocó
 Capurganá in Chocó 
 Puerto Nuevo in La Guajira
 Puerto Simón Bolívar in La Guajira
 Santa Marta in Magdalena
 Tumaco in Nariño
 Providencia in the Archipelago of San Andrés
 San Andrés in the Archipelago of San Andrés
 Coveñas in Sucre
 Buenaventura in Valle del Cauca

See also
National Directorate of Taxes and Customs

References

Government agencies of Colombia
Foreign trade of Colombia
Border guards